Indrajith is a 2007 Indian Malayalam film, directed by KK Haridas, starring Kalabhavan Mani and Indraja in the lead roles.

Cast

 Kalabhavan Mani as Changootam Bhasi
 Divya Viswanath as Lakshmi
 Indraja as Shahina
 Nedumudi Venu as Panchayath President Madhavan Maashu
 Baburaj as Hameed
 Cochin Haneefa as Udumbu Rudrakshan
 Rajan P Dev as Chemparunthu Bhaskaran
 Adam Ayoob as Raghavan	
 Ambika Mohan
 Sreejith Ravi as Jamal
 Anil Murali as Hari
 Bineesh Kodiyeri as Johny
 Priyanka Anoop as SI Vishalayam
 Indrans as Radhakrishnan	
 Kanakalatha as Susheela
 Mini Arun
 Riyaz Khan as Rajendran	
 Saiju Kurup as Saheer Musthafa
 Shalu Menon as Suma
Sudheer Sukumaran as Achankunju
P. Sreekumar as Vasudevan

Soundtrack 
The film's soundtrack contains 3 songs, all composed by S. Jayan and Lyrics by Rajiv Alunkal.

References

External links

2007 films
2000s Malayalam-language films